Western Air Express Flight 7, a domestic scheduled passenger flight from Salt Lake City to Burbank, California, crashed on January 12, 1937 near Newhall, California. The twin engine Boeing 247D, registration NC13315, crashed shortly after 11:00 a.m. in adverse weather conditions. Of the three crew and ten passengers on board, one crew member and four passengers perished. One of the fatalities was noted international adventurer and filmmaker Martin Johnson, of Martin and Osa Johnson fame.

The off-course Boeing 247D, en route from Salt Lake City, was on approach to the Union Air Terminal at Burbank, California in severely lowered visibility due to heavy rain and fog. On suddenly spotting a ridge looming directly ahead, pilot William L. Lewis cut power to the engines and "pancaked" onto the hillside to reduce the force of the impact.

The airliner first struck the ground with the left wing tip. It then skidded along the side of the mountain in a curved path for approximately 125 feet, finally coming to rest headed in the opposite direction from which it struck. The point of collision was at an elevation of 3550 feet, near the summit of Los Pinetos, the highest mountain in the immediate vicinity.

One passenger died immediately and three more died within a week, as did the co-pilot, C. T. Owens. Martin Johnson died of a fractured skull while hospitalized. His wife Osa suffered back and neck injuries but continued with the couple’s lecture circuit, doing so from her wheelchair. She later sued Western Air Express and United Airports Co of California for $502,539 but lost on appeal in 1941.

One of the survivors was a 25-year-old passenger who managed to hike five miles down the mountainside where he met rescuers from the Olive View Sanitarium who were searching for the accident site.

The accident was investigated by the Accident Board of the Bureau of Air Commerce, under the authority of the Department of Commerce. The cause was attributed to the adverse weather conditions, coupled with the pilot’s decision to descend to a dangerously low altitude without positive knowledge of his position.

See also
 1937 in aviation
 1937 in the United States
 Aviation accidents and incidents
 List of accidents and incidents involving commercial aircraft

References

External links
 
  - includes brief glimpse of NC13315 at 06:00 mark
  - includes wreckage photographs
  - names of passengers & crew
 
  (related to above Evening Independent article, but edited with alternate content)

Airliner accidents and incidents in California
Aviation accidents and incidents in the United States in 1937
1937 in California
1937 in Los Angeles
Disasters in Los Angeles
History of Los Angeles County, California
Santa Clarita, California
7
Accidents and incidents involving the Boeing 247